The 1953 ADAC 1000 Kilometer-Rennen Nürburgring took place on 30 August, on the Nürburgring Nordschleife, (West Germany).  It was also the fifth round of the F.I.A. World Sports Car Championship. This was the first time the event had taken place, although it would not run again until 1956.

Report

Entry

A grand total of 66 racing cars were registered for this event, of which 54 arrived for practice and qualifying.  Scuderia Ferrari, under the name of Automobili Ferrari, arrived with three  375 MMs for the all-Italian pairings of Giuseppe Farina / Alberto Ascari and Umberto Maglioli / Piero Carini, with the third car for Luigi Villoresi and Mike Hawthorn.  Scuderia Lancia entered two D24s, the first driven by Juan Manuel Fangio, who had switched from Alfa Romeo,  and Felice Bonetto, and the second driven by Robert Manzon and Piero Taruffi. . Lancia also entered an older D20 driven by Giovanni Bracco and Eugenio Castellotti.  Also from Italy came three works Maserati A6GCSs.

Qualifying

The Lancia D24 of  Juan Manuel Fangio took pole position, averaging a speed of 83.714 mph around the 14.167 mile circuit. However, following engine problems, the Ferrari 375 MM of Mike Hawthorn and Luigi Villoresi was withdrawn from the meeting and their engine used by the lead car of Alberto Ascari and Giuseppe Farina. The team's third entry was also withdrawn from the meeting.

Race

A lead Lancias fell out of contention by lap 15, but then the factory efforts and the bigger privateers began to run into trouble. Although two of the three works Ferraris were withdrawn prior to the start of the race, Scuderia victory was never seriously threatened despite the first three cars were all being one same lap as the race winners, Ascari / Farina.

For the second round running, the Scottish Ecurie Ecosse finished second overall. The pairing of Ian Stewart and Roy Salvadori were over 15 minutes behind the Ferrari, but still won their class by three laps. Almost 30 minutes behind the winner, Adolf Brudes and Franz Eugen Hammernick reached the finish in their Borgward Hansa 1500RS in third place overall. The other works Borgward of Karl Guenther Bechem / Theo Helfrich had taken the car up to third place before retiring with an engine failure. The last two classified finishers were two Gutbrod Superiors with a 700cc two-stroke engine. They were seven laps behind the Ferrari.

The winning partnership of Ascari/Farina won in a time of 8hr 20:44.0mins., averaging a speed of 74.694 mph. They covered a distance of 2,281.182 miles. The race did not end when the overall winner crossed the finishing line, but continued for another hour to allow the other classes to try and complete the full 1000 km.

Official Classification

Class Winners are in Bold text.

 Fastest Lap: Robert Manzon, 10:23.000secs (81.866 mph)

Class Winners

Standings after the race

 Note: Only the top five positions are included in this set of standings.
Championship points were awarded for the first six places in each race in the order of 8-6-4-3-2-1. Manufacturers were only awarded points for their highest finishing car with no points awarded for positions filled by additional cars. Only the best 4 results out of the 7 races could be retained by each manufacturer. Points earned but not counted towards the championship totals are listed within brackets in the above table.

References

Nurburgring
6 Hours of Nürburgring
1953 in German motorsport
1953 in West German motorsport